Peter Bolliger (born 18 May 1937) is a Swiss rower who competed in the 1964 Summer Olympics and in the 1968 Summer Olympics.

He was born in Basel, Switzerland.

In 1964 he finished seventh with his partner Nicolas Gobet in the coxless pair event.

Four years later at the 1968 Summer Olympics he won the bronze medal with the Swiss boat in the coxed four competition.

External links
 Peter Bolliger Biography

1937 births
Living people
Swiss male rowers
Olympic rowers of Switzerland
Rowers at the 1964 Summer Olympics
Rowers at the 1968 Summer Olympics
Olympic bronze medalists for Switzerland
Olympic medalists in rowing
Medalists at the 1968 Summer Olympics
European Rowing Championships medalists
Sportspeople from Basel-Stadt
20th-century Swiss people